Mike Sharpe (1951–2016) was a Canadian professional wrestler.

Mike Sharpe may also refer to:

Mike Sharpe (sprinter) (1956–2021), Bermudian sprinter
Mike Sharpe (1922–1988), Canadian professional wrestler of the Sharpe Brothers duo
Mike Sharpe, saxophone performer of song "Spooky"

See also
Michael Sharpe (disambiguation)